Chandrashekar Patil (18 June 193910 January 2022), popularly known as Champa, was an Indian poet, playwright and public intellectual writing in Kannada. Patil was a recipient of the Karnataka Sahitya Akademi Award for Poetry in 1989 and the Karnataka state government's Pampa Award in 2009. Patil had served as the president of the Kannada Sahitya Parishat, a Kannada language literary organization.

Life and career 
Champa was the editor of the literary journal Sankramana started with two of his friends Siddalinga Pattanashetti and Giraddi Govindaraj in 1964. He was known for leading many social and literary movements such as Gokak agitation, Bandaya movement, anti-Emergency agitation, agitation for the implementation of Mandal report, Farmer's movement amongst others.

After retiring as professor of English from Karnatak University, Patil served as the President of Kannada Sahitya Parishat and as the Chairman of Kannada Development Authority. Patil was a recipient of the Karnataka Sahitya Akademi Award for Poetry in 1989 and the Karnataka state government's Pampa Award in 2009.

In addition to Kannada language, Patil also wrote in English. An anthology of his poems titled, At the other end, was published in 1983. The anthology included both poems written originally in English and his own poems translated from Kannada.

Patil was a proponent of Kannada language as a medium of instruction in the state's government schools and had spoken out in 2019 against the then state government's move to introduce English as the medium of instruction in the state's government schools. Earlier, in 2015, protesting the assassination of his friend and Vachana scholar M. M. Kalburgi, he returned his Pampa Award, the highest literary honour of the government of Karnataka.

Patil died in Bangalore on 10 January 2022, at the age of 83.

Works

Poetry
Source(s):

 Banuli (1960)
 Madhyabindu
 19 Kavanagalu
 Gandhi smarane
 Hoovu Hennu Taare
 Shalmala Nanna Shalmala
 Ardha Satyada Hudugi (1989; Karnataka Sahitya Akademi Award for Poetry)
 Gundammana Gazhalagal

Plays
Source(s):

Kodegalu
 Appa (1969)
 Gurtinavaru (1971)
 Tingara Buddanna (1971)
 Kattala Ratri
 Gokarnada Goudasani (1974)
 Nalakaviya Mastabhisheka (1979)
 Jagadamebeya Beedinataka

Essays
Source(s):

 Nanna Haadina Halla
 Anarogyave Bhagya
 Champadakiya
 Nanu Kandante Nanage Kandashtu
 Aksharalokada Aakritigalu
 Champa Nota
 Champa Column
 Nanna Guru Gokak
 Kritikendritha
 Nitya Varthamana
 Kannada Kannada Barri Namma Sangada

References 

1939 births
2022 deaths
20th-century Indian dramatists and playwrights
20th-century Indian male writers
20th-century Indian poets
Kannada poets
Kannada dramatists and playwrights
Bandaya writers
Academic staff of Karnatak University
Alumni of the University of Leeds
Poets from Karnataka
Kannada-language writers
Indian male dramatists and playwrights
Dramatists and playwrights from Karnataka
People from Haveri district